Lake Township is one of the fifteen townships of Ashland County, Ohio, United States. As of the 2010 census the population was 690.

Geography
Located in the southeastern part of the county, it borders the following townships:
Mohican Township - north
Plain Township, Wayne County - northeast corner
Clinton Township, Wayne County - east
Washington Township, Holmes County - south
Green Township - west
Vermillion Township - northwest corner

No municipalities are located in Lake Township.

Name and history
Lake Township was organized in 1814.
 
Statewide, other Lake Townships are located in Logan, Stark, and Wood counties.

Government
The township is governed by a three-member board of trustees, who are elected in November of odd-numbered years to a four-year term beginning on the following January 1. Two are elected in the year after the presidential election and one is elected in the year before it. There is also an elected township fiscal officer, who serves a four-year term beginning on April 1 of the year after the election, which is held in November of the year before the presidential election. Vacancies in the fiscal officership or on the board of trustees are filled by the remaining trustees.

References

External links
County website

Townships in Ashland County, Ohio
1814 establishments in Ohio
Populated places established in 1814
Townships in Ohio